Private Eyes is the second solo album by guitarist Tommy Bolin. This was Bolin's last album, as he died of a drug overdose while on the promotional tour, opening for Jeff Beck.

Track listing 
"Bustin' Out for Rosey" (Bolin) – 4:24
"Sweet Burgundy" (Bolin, Jeff Cook) – 4:13
"Post Toastee" (Bolin) – 9:03
"Shake the Devil" (Bolin, Cook) – 3:47
"Gypsy Soul" (Bolin, Cook) – 4:05 
"Someday We'll Bring Our Love Home" (Bolin, John Tesar) – 3:05
"Hello, Again" (Bolin, Cook) – 3:39
"You Told Me That You Loved Me" (Bolin) – 5:15

Personnel
Tommy Bolin – Guitars, Keyboards, Vocals, Piano
Reggie McBride – Bass, Vocals
Mark Stein – Keyboards, Vocals
Carmine Appice – Drums on "Someday We'll Bring Our Love Home"
Bobby Berge – Percussion, Drums
Bobbye Hall – Percussion
Norma Jean Bell – Percussion, Vocals, Saxophone
Del Newman – string arrangements

Production
Produced By Tommy Bolin & Dennis MacKay 
Engineered By Thomas La Tonore and Stephen W Tayler
Album design By Jimmy Wachtel

References

Columbia Records albums
Tommy Bolin albums
1976 albums
Albums with cover art by Jimmy Wachtel
Albums recorded at Trident Studios